Junud al-Sham (Soldiers of the Levant), sometimes also called Jund al-Sham, is a group of Chechen and Lebanese Sunni mujahideen that fight in the Syrian Civil War and were led by Muslim Abu Walid al Shishani until his death in 2021. Abu Turab Shishani as deputy leader has led the group since.

History 
Unlike many other foreign mujahideen, Junud al-Sham remained mostly independent from other Syrian rebel groups. Many of its fighters defected to Islamic State of Iraq and the Levant commander Abu Omar al-Shishani in 2014. The remainder of the group remained combat-ready, and continued to take part in military operations in 2015. Financial difficulties caused a further decline, however, and some sources claimed that it was reduced to merely 30 fighters by early 2016. Many of its members had reportedly left in order to join the Islamic State of Iraq and the Levant. In a video address, Muslim Shishani consequently reproached other insurgent groups in Syria for not providing assistance, which regional expert Joanna Paraszczuk described as a "rant". In September 2016, Junud al-Sham travelled to Hama Governorate in order to fight in a local rebel offensive. Later that year, there were reports according to which the group had dissolved, reportedly as result of clashes with Ahrar al-Sham, with many of its Chechen fighters reportedly joining Ajnad al-Kavkaz.

Despite these reports, however, other reports suggested remnants of Junud al-Sham were still active by 2018. In January 2018, pro-government media reported that "a military source in Damascus" said the group took part in a major military campaign against the government in northwestern Syria.  Meanwhile, the Turkish newspaper Yeni Akit claimed he was participating in the Turkish military operation in Afrin. However, Shishani denied that he or his followers were in Afrin, and confirmed he was in Hama, fighting alongside another Chechen militia, Tarkhan Gaziyev's Katiba Abd Ar-Rahman. A German foreign fighter with the group named Abu Khalid al-Shami said in an interview from 22 July 2019 that the group clashed with ISIL in Abu Dali.

See also
 List of armed groups in the Syrian Civil War

References

External links
 Junud al-Sham's YouTube Channel

Anti-government factions of the Syrian civil war
Jihadist groups in Syria